Poiocera is a genus of planthoppers in the family Fulgoridae (subfamily Poiocerinae) occurring in South America.

Species

 Poiocera conspersa (Germar, 1830) - type species
 Poiocera flaviventris (Germar, 1830)
 Poiocera rugulosa Walker, 1858
 Poiocera sperabilis Walker, 1858
 Poiocera turca Fabricius, 1775

References

External links
 Image on insetologia.com.br (retrieved 4 January 2021)
FLOW: Poiocera

Auchenorrhyncha genera
Poiocerinae